Sinatra/Jobim: The Complete Reprise Recordings is a 2010 compilation album by Frank Sinatra, consisting of 20 tracks he recorded with the Brazilian musician Antônio Carlos Jobim.

Track listing
 "The Girl from Ipanema" (Antônio Carlos Jobim, Norman Gimbel, Vinícius de Moraes) – 3:20
 "Dindi" (Ray Gilbert, Jobim, Aloysio de Oliveria) – 3:31
 "Change Partners" (Irving Berlin) – 2:43
 "Quiet Nights of Quiet Stars" (Jobim, Gene Lees) – 2:45
 "Meditation" (Jobim, Gimbel, Newton Mendonça) – 2:55
 "If You Never Come to Me" (Jobim, Gilbert, de Oliveira) – 2:11
 "How Insensitive" (Jobim, Gimbel, de Moraes) – 3:18
 "I Concentrate on You" (Cole Porter) – 2:39
 "Baubles, Bangles and Beads" (Robert Wright, George Forrest, Alexander Borodin) – 2:36
 "Once I Loved (O Amor em Paz)" (Jobim, Gilbert, de Moraes) – 2:38
 "The Song of the Sabia (Sabiá)" – (Jobim, Chico Buarque, Gimbel) – 3:40
 "Drinking Water (Agua de Beber)" (de Moraes, Jobim, Gimbel)  – 2:37
 "Someone to Light Up My Life" (de Moraes, Jobim, Lees) – 2:40
 "Triste" (Jobim) – 2:42
 "This Happy Madness (Estrada Branca)" (de Moraes, Jobim, Lees) – 2:57
 "One Note Samba (Samba de Uma Nota So)" (Jobim, Mendonça) – 2:22
 "Don't Ever Go Away (Por Causa de Você)" (Gilbert, Dolores Duran, Jobim) – 2:30
 "Wave" (Jobim) – 3:21
 "Off Key" (Desafinado)"  (Lees, Jobim, Mendonça) – 3:09
 "Bonita" (Gilbert, Jobim, Lees) – 3:40

Personnel
 Frank Sinatra – vocals
 Antônio Carlos Jobim – vocals, guitar
 Claus Ogerman – arranger, conductor (Tracks 1-10)
 Eumir Deodato – arranger (Tracks 11–20)
 Morris Stoloff – conductor (Tracks 11–20)

See also
 Francis Albert Sinatra & Antonio Carlos Jobim (1967)
 Sinatra & Company (1971)

References

Antônio Carlos Jobim albums
2010 compilation albums
Frank Sinatra compilation albums
Bossa nova albums